Always Jane is an American docuseries directed by Jonathan C Hyde. The series follows two years in the life of Jane Noury, a transgender teenager living in rural New Jersey. Filmed in 2019 and 2020, it premiered on Amazon Prime Video on November 12, 2021.

Summary
Jane Noury lives with her family in rural New Jersey as she nears her high school graduation and prepares for college. A transgender teenager who came out around the age of 15, she is pursuing a career in modeling and acting.

Production 
As Noury began to pursue modeling, she and her mother met Jonathan C. Hyde at a brunch for competitors in a model search event. Hyde had intended to make a film about the model search, but upon meeting Noury was inspired by her story and changed his plans.

Of the series Noury said to The Guardian, “This was never planned to happen. It was not supposed to be an Amazon show". “It is a transgender coming of age story but it’s also more about just the behind the scenes of my life and trying to figure out what I want as I get older.”

Cast
 Jane Noury
 Gabriel Golam
 Laura Noury
 David Noury
 Mae Noury
 Emma Noury

Episodes

Release
The trailer was released on October 21, 2021. All four episodes of the series premiered on Prime Video on November 12, 2021.

Reception
Adrian Horton of The Guardian wrote, "The series offers a compassionate and understated window into a late adolescent experience still massively underrepresented on-screen." Angie Han of The Hollywood Reporter wrote that it is "in many ways a win for representation, positioning the story of trans teen Jane and her family as a cuddly (and very overt) argument for supporting and protecting trans kids," but concluded that "the docuseries wants for depth and specificity." Indiewire published a critical review of the series, with Kristen Lopez writing, "The problem is the entire affair, too often, feels like inspiration porn. Where the joy for the audience is going to be seeing how inspiring Jane is — and little else."

See also
Jazz Jennings

References

External links 
 

English-language television shows
Amazon Prime Video original programming
2020s American documentary television series
2021 American television series debuts
2020s American LGBT-related television series
Transgender-related television shows
Television shows set in New Jersey
Television series by Amazon Studios
American LGBT-related reality television series
2020s LGBT-related reality television series